Ernest Clyde Cowley (17 August 1892 – 20 October 1975) was an Australian rules footballer who played for Carlton in the Victorian Football League (VFL).

Background

Cowley came to Carlton from Brunswick and had a strong debut season, kicking 35 goals to top the VFL's goalkicking. He played just one more year with Carlton before returning to the VFA where he joined Prahran. Cowley was also a proficient baseball pitcher who represented Victoria in interstate competition.

Cowley invented the football game called "Austus", a combination of Australian and American football which was played between Australians and visiting American servicemen during World War II. He was a journalist with the Sporting Globe and wrote on American sports, particularly baseball.

References

Holmesby, Russell and Main, Jim (2007). The Encyclopedia of AFL Footballers. 7th ed. Melbourne: Bas Publishing.

1892 births
Australian rules footballers from Melbourne
Carlton Football Club players
Brunswick Football Club players
Prahran Football Club players
VFL Leading Goalkicker Medal winners
Australian sports journalists
1975 deaths
People from Brunswick, Victoria